Hossein Shariatmadari is the managing editor of Kayhan, a conservative Iranian newspaper.

Career
A strong supporter of president Mahmoud Ahmadinejad, he has been described as being "a close confidant of Iran’s supreme leader" Ali Khamenei, and as having "links" to Iran's intelligence services.

On 17 April 2012 Shariatmadari published an editorial in which he stressed Iran's right to enrich uranium to 99%.

Controversies
After the controversial 2009 election and weeks of protest, Shariatmadari wrote an editorial in Kayhan alleging that defeated candidate Mir Hossein Mousavi was trying to "escape punishment for murdering innocent people, holding riots, cooperating with foreigners and acting as America's fifth column inside the country" and called for Mousavi and former reformist President Mohammad Khatami to be tried in court for "horrible crimes and treason."

In 2020, Shariatmadari said that the Holocaust "was falsely claimed by Zionist and Western governments" and that the real Holocaust was of Christians in Najran by Yemenite Jews in 524 CE. The article, shared by the semi-official Fars News Agency, was condemned as an antisemitic promotion of Holocaust denial.

References

External links

1948 births
Living people
Iranian journalists
People from Tehran Province
Iranian editors
Representatives of the Supreme Leader in the Keyhan Institute
Islamic Revolutionary Guard Corps officers
Association of Muslim Journalists politicians